Christoff Van Heerden (born 13 January 1985) is a South African former professional racing cyclist. In 2010 he won the South African National Road Race Championships.

Major results
2006
 1st Powerade Dome 2 Dome Cycling Spectacular
 1st Stage 5 Tour of Mauritius
2007
 1st Amashova National Classic
 3rd Memorial Philippe Van Coningsloo
 8th Tour du Jura
2008
 1st Overall Tour of Hong Kong Shanghai
1st Stages 1 & 6 (ITT) & 6
 2nd Overall Tour of Pennsylvania
 2nd Intaka Tech Worlds View Challenge 4
 3rd Intaka Tech Worlds View Challenge 3
 5th Road race, National Road Championships
2009
 African Road Championships
1st  Team time trial (with Reinardt Janse van Rensburg, Ian McLeod and Jay Robert Thomson)
7th Road race
 2nd Giro del Capo Challenge 1
 6th Giro del Capo Challenge 4
2010
 1st  Road race, National Road Championships
2011
 3rd Road race, National Road Championships

References

External links
 

1985 births
Living people
South African male cyclists
People from Benoni
White South African people
Sportspeople from Gauteng